The Stork Said Yes (La cigüeña dijo ¡Sí!) is a 1955 Argentine comedy film directed by Enrique Carreras, from a script by Alejandro Casona based on a Carlos Llopis play. It stars Lola Membrives, Tomás Blanco, Esteban Serrador and Susana Campos and premiered on April 22, 1955. It was the last of Lola Membrives' few incursions into cinema. In 1971, Carreras remade the film based on the same play as La familia hippie, starring Palito Ortega.

Plot
A mature married couple happily receives the news of pregnancy while a young couple has the disappointment of a frustrated attempt.

Cast
  Lola Membrives as Doña Antonina
  Tomás Blanco as Don Eduardo
  Esteban Serrador as Claudio
  Susana Campos as Pilar
  Hugo Pimentel as Solís
  Paquita Más as Felisa
  Delfy Miranda
  Antonio Martiánez as Dr. Fernández Pérez
  Elder Barber

Reception 
The critic Manuel Rey, known as "King", said that the film was a "A successful comedy". La Nación wrote that its "festive tone is achieved with communicative grace...its light plot has counted with good effect situations."

References

External links
 

1955 films
1950s Argentine films
1950s Spanish-language films
Argentine black-and-white films
Films directed by Enrique Carreras
1955 comedy films
Argentine comedy films